Jyoti Bhushan Chaki (1925 - 27 March 2008) was an Indian Bengali linguist, academic and polyglot. He had proficiency with 18 different languages.

Biography 
Jyoti Bhushan Chaki was born in 1925 in his maternal house in Dinajpur district now situated in Bangladesh. He came Kolkata for education in 1945.  At first Chaki worked as a teacher in Modern School in 1954. Then he worked as a teacher in a school of Kolkata named Jagadbandhu Institution. He wrote several books on linguistic. He had proficiency with 18 different languages. He was also a member of Akademi Banan Upo-Samiti or Akademi Spelling Sub-Committee. He died on 27 March 2008 in a hospital in Kolkata following brain haemorrhage.

Bibliography 
 Bangla Bhashar Byakoron  Ananda Publishers
 Bagortho koutuk  Ananda Publishers
 Ek Jhank Golpo: Arabi, Pharshi o Sanskrit Chirayata Kahini

Recognitions 
 Vidyasagar award
 Bhasha Bhushan from Bharatiya Bhasha Parishad
 Honorary D Litt from Jadavpur University

See also 
 Ziad Fazah

References 

2008 deaths
Bengali writers
20th-century Indian linguists
Year of birth missing
Recipients of the Sahitya Akademi Prize for Translation
Writers from West Bengal